The Eastern Knights are a regional cricket club re-founded in 2016 representing the east coast of Scotland in the Cricket Scotland Regional Pro Series, the premier domestic competition for cricket in Scotland, roughly analogous to the England and Wales Cricket Board County Championship south of the border.

Grounds
The clubs home grounds are at The Grange in Edinburgh, and at Merchiston.

Competition History
As a team the Eastern Knights are currently the most successful club in both the Regional Pro Series 50 over and 20 over competitions.

References

Scottish club cricket teams
Cricket in Scotland
2016 establishments in Scotland
2016 in Scottish cricket
Sports teams in Edinburgh